David Hacohen (born 20 October 1898, died 19 February 1984) was an Israeli politician who served as a member of the Knesset between 1949 and 1953, and again from 1955 until 1969. He fought with the Ottoman Army in World War I. After the war he studied law and economics in London, then returned to Mandatory Palestine in the 1920s. He was a member of Haganah, and served with the British in World War II. He was arrested by the British in Operation Agatha.

Biography

Hacohen was born in Gomel in the Russian Empire (today in Belarus). He studied at a local heder, before his family immigrated to Ottoman-controlled Palestine in 1907. He then attended Herzliya Hebrew High School. In 1916 he joined the Ottoman Army and fought in World War I. Following the war,  he studied law and economics in London between 1919 and 1923.

After returning to Palestine he became Director of the Office of Public Works and Planning, which later became a company under the name Solel Boneh. He also became a member of the Haganah, which operated an underground radio station from his home in Haifa, and was elected to Haifa City Council. During World War II he was an officer in the British Army, serving as a liaison between the British Army and the Haganah. However, following the war he was arrested by the British authorities during Operation Agatha in 1946 and imprisoned. In the same year he married the writer Bracha Habas.

In 1949 Hacohen was elected to the first Knesset on the Mapai list. He was re-elected in 1951 elections, but resigned from the Knesset on 1 December 1953 after he was appointed Israeli ambassador to Burma, a post he held until 1955. That year he was returned to the Knesset on the Mapai list, and was subsequently re-elected in 1959, 1961 and 1965, by which time Mapai had formed the Alignment alliance with Ahdut HaAvoda, serving until the 1969 elections. During his time as an MK, he was a delegate to the Inter-Parliamentary Union and served on its executive board.

Hacohen died in 1984 at the age of 85.

References

External links
 

1898 births
1984 deaths
People from Gomel
People from Gomelsky Uyezd
Belarusian Jews
Israeli people of Belarusian-Jewish descent
Jews from the Russian Empire
Israeli Ashkenazi Jews
Emigrants from the Russian Empire to the Ottoman Empire
Ashkenazi Jews in Ottoman Palestine
Ashkenazi Jews in Mandatory Palestine
Herzliya Hebrew Gymnasium alumni
Ottoman military personnel of World War I
Haganah members
British Army personnel of World War II
Israeli diplomats
Israeli Labor Party politicians
Mapai politicians
Alignment (Israel) politicians
Members of the 1st Knesset (1949–1951)
Members of the 2nd Knesset (1951–1955)
Members of the 3rd Knesset (1955–1959)
Members of the 4th Knesset (1959–1961)
Members of the 5th Knesset (1961–1965)
Members of the 6th Knesset (1965–1969)
Ambassadors of Israel to Myanmar